The Antonov An-24 has suffered 159 accidents with a total of 2,134 fatalities.

1960s

29 July 1962 An An-24 (CCCP-46708) still owned by Antonov crashed at Ternopil Airport during a test flight while simulating a right-engine failure; all eight crew on board survived, but the aircraft was written off.

20 March 1965 An Aeroflot An-24 (CCCP-46764) landed short of the runway at Khanty-Mansiysk Airport, struck a snow drift and broke up, killing 43 of 47 on board. The cause of the crash was not determined, but pilot error was blamed.

2 February 1966 A United Arab Airlines An-24 (SU-AOB) crashed at Luxor, Egypt during a test flight.

18 March 1966 United Arab Airlines Flight 749 crashed while attempting to land at Cairo International Airport. All 30 passengers and crew on board were killed.

29 August 1966 A Cubana An-24 (CU-T875) was written off at Camaguey Airport.

30 September 1966 United Arab Airlines Flight 322 (an An-24B, SU-AOM) struck a camel while taking off from Luxor International Airport, damaging the right side landing gear. The aircraft was able to make a wheels-up landing at Cairo with no casualties to the 43 on board.

7 February 1967 A United Arab Airlines An-24 was hijacked by one person and flown to Amman, Jordan.

30 December 1967 Aeroflot Flight L-51, an An-24B (CCCP-46215), crashed near Liepāja Airport after the crew put the left engine into reverse thrust in an attempt to slow the aircraft down for landing, killing 44 of 51 on board. The crash remains the deadliest air disaster in Latvia.

31 December 1967 An Aeroflot An-24B (CCCP-46201) crashed short of the runway at Voronezh Airport.

6 January 1968 Aeroflot Flight 1668, an An-24B (CCCP-47733), broke apart in mid-air and crashed 58 mi from Olekminsk, Russia, killing all 45 on board; the aircraft may have been shot down by a stray missile although a cause was never definitively identified.

24 January 1969 LOT Polish Airlines Flight 149 (SP-LTE) from Warsaw to Wrocław (Poland) with 48 passengers and crew on board crashed shortly before landing at the Wrocław Strachowice Airport due to crew error. There were no casualties although the aircraft was written off.

24 March 1969 Aeroflot Flight 2305, an An-24 (CCCP-46751), crashed on climbout from Alma-Ata Airport after the right side engine lost power, killing four of 31 on board.

2 April 1969 LOT Polish Airlines Flight 165 crashed into Polica, a mountain near Zawoja after the pilots became disorientated in a snowstorm, killing all 53 on board.

3 August 1969 Aeroflot Flight H-826, an An-24B (CCCP-46248), crashed at Preobrazhenka, Ukraine after a propeller blade separated and punctured the fuselage, severing the controls for the elevator and ailerons. The crew lost control of the aircraft and the aircraft crashed, killing all 55 on board.

18 August 1969 A Misrair An-24 was hijacked by six people and flown to El Wagah, Egypt.

13 October 1969 Aeroflot Flight 227, an An-24B (CCCP-47772), crashed short of the runway at Nizhnevartovsk Airport after a propeller was inadvertently feathered, killing 24 of 56 on board.

19 October 1969 A LOT Polish Airlines An-24B (SP-LTK) was hijacked by two people and flown to Tegel Airport.

20 November 1969 A LOT Polish Airlines An-24B (SP-LTB) was hijacked by two people and flown to Vienna, Austria.

1970s

1970 An Aeroflot An-24B (CCCP-46241) caught fire and burned out during refueling at Saratov Airport; the accident also could have happened in 1971, when the aircraft was cancelled from the Soviet register.

28 January 1970 An Aeroflot An-24B (CCCP-47701) struck a mountain 25 mi from Batagay, Russia after the crew began descending too soon, killing all 34 passengers and crew on board.

30 January 1970 A United Arab Airlines An-24B (SU-AOK) crashed on landing at Luxor Airport after the undercarriage collapsed.

4 February 1970 TAROM Flight 35, an An-24B (YR-AMT), crashed in the Vladeasa mountains in poor visibility, killing 20 of 21 on board. The aircraft was leased from the Romanian government.

14 March 1970 A United Arab Airlines An-24B (SU-AOC) made a wheels-up landing at Cairo International Airport following an engine explosion; all 15 on board survived, but the aircraft was written off. The explosion was caused by a bomb that been placed in the left engine.

1 April 1970 Aeroflot Flight 1661, an An-24B (CCCP-47751), collided in mid-air with a weather balloon and crashed near Togushina, Novosibirsk region, Russia, killing all 45 passengers and crew on board.

5 June 1970 A LOT Polish Airlines An-24 was hijacked by one person who demanded political asylum and diverted to Copenhagen, Denmark.

19 July 1970 A United Arab Airlines An-24B (SU-ANZ) crashed at Cairo due to pilot error while on a training flight, killing the three crew.

7 August 1970 A LOT Polish Airlines An-24 was hijacked by one person who demanded to be taken to Germany and diverted to East Berlin.

26 August 1970 A LOT Polish Airlines An-24 was hijacked by three people who demanded to be taken to Austria.

16 September 1970 A person, armed with a dagger and gun, attempted to hijack a United Arab Airlines An-24 and demanded to be taken to Saudi Arabia; the hijacker was overpowered by the on-board security guard.

15 October 1970 An Aeroflot An-24B (CCCP-46256) was hijacked by two people who demanded to be taken to Turkey and diverted to Trabzon Airport. One person died.

31 March 1971 An Aeroflot An-24 (CCCP-46747) crashed near Moscow during a training flight.

1 June 1971 An Aeroflot An-24B (CCCP-47729) crashed on Bogodorsk Island during a training flight. The aircraft was flying with one engine shut down when the flight engineer shut down the other engine by mistake.

12 November 1971 Aeroflot Flight N-63, an An-24B (CCCP-46809), stalled and crashed short of the runway at Vinnitsa Airport during a go-around, killing all 48 passengers and crew on board.

13 November 1971 Aeroflot Flight 639, an An-24B (CCCP-46378) struck a cable and crashed while on approach to Kerch Airport, killing six of 11 on board.

15 November 1971 A Tarom An-24RV (YR-AMA) crashed at Otopeni International Airport during an ILS approach; all 22 passengers and crew on board survived, but the aircraft was written off.

1 December 1971 Aeroflot Flight 2174, an An-24B (CCCP-46788), lost control and crashed near Saratov Airport due to icing, killing all 57 passengers and crew on board.

22 February 1972 Aeroflot Flight 25, an An-24 (CCCP-46732), lost control and crashed near Lipetsk Airport after the pilot applied reverse thrust by mistake; there were no casualties but the aircraft was written off.

27 February 1972 An Aeroflot An-24B (CCCP-46418) lost control and crashed while on approach to Mineralnye Vody Airport after the pilot applied reverse thrust by mistake; there were no casualties but the aircraft was written off.

16 May 1972 Soviet Navy An-24T 05 was returning to Khrabovo Airport following a weather research flight when it struck trees and crashed at Svetlogorsk, Russia, killing all eight on board and 25 on the ground. The altimeter had been set incorrectly, showing the aircraft at a higher altitude than it actually was.

4 November 1972 An Aeroflot An-24B (CCCP-46202) was on a positioning flight when it struck trees and crashed near Vostochny Airport in snow; all three crew survived, but the aircraft was written off.

21 January 1973 Aeroflot Flight 6263, an An-24B (CCCP-46276), lost control and crashed near Petukhovo, Russia, killing all 39 passengers and crew on board; the aircraft may have been shot down by a missile. Four passengers initially survived the crash, but died in the below-zero temperatures before rescue parties reached the crash site.

28 February 1973 Polish Air Force An-24B 012 crashed near Goleniow Airport, Szczecin due to wing icing. All 18 people on board were killed (including ministers of the interior of Poland and Czechoslovakia).

30 April 1973 A South Yemen Air Force aircraft, probably an An-24, crashed in Yemen, killing all 25 on board. The aircraft type has not been confirmed, with possible types being an An-24, An-12, or a Yemenia Douglas DC-3.

14 May 1973 Cubana Flight 707, an An-24V (CU-T876), crashed on landing at Jose Marti International Airport in bad weather due to possible pilot errors, killing three.

18 August 1973 Aeroflot Flight A-13, an An-24B (CCCP-46435), struck a cable on an oil rig at Neftyanyye Kamni oilfield ( east of Baku) and crashed while attempting to return to Bina International Airport following an uncontained engine failure, killing 56 of 64 on board.

17 September 1973 A MIAT Mongolian Airlines An-24B (BNMAU-4206) struck a mountain during descent in Hovd Province, Mongolia.

6 January 1974 Aeroflot Flight N-75, an An-24B (CCCP-46357), lost control and crashed at Mukachevo, Ukraine due to icing, killing all 24 on board.

25 January 1974 An Aeroflot An-24B (CCCP-46277) was being flown out of Rostov following maintenance when it crashed after takeoff from Rostov Airport due to artificial horizon failure, killing the four crew.

8 March 1974 A Pathet Lao Airlines An-24 (possibly XW-TCA) crashed near Hanoi, killing all 18 on board.

6 July 1974 A Soviet Air Force An-24T lost control and crashed near Sinitsyno, Saratov Oblast after suffering a bird strike on final approach; killing the five crew.

29 December 1974 A TAROM An-24RV (YR-AMD) operating on a domestic scheduled flight from Bucharest to Sibiu struck the side of the Mountains (Muntii) Lotrului (22 km south of Sibiu) at  after the aircraft drifted off course due to crew error, killing all 33 on board.

14 April 1975 Bulgarian Air Force An-24 035 crashed near Sofia, Bulgaria.

25 April 1975 An Aeroflot An-24RV (CCCP-46476) crashed short of the runway at Poltava Airport after the pilot descended into ground fog; all 11 on board survived, but the aircraft was written off.

28 June 1975 A Balkan Bulgarian Airlines An-24 was hijacked by one person and diverted to Greece.

17 November 1975 Aeroflot Flight 6274, an An-24RV (CCCP-46467), struck Mount Apshara due to crew disorientation, killing all 38 on board.

20 November 1975 Aeroflot Flight 7950, an An-24B (CCCP-46349), struck a hill 11 mi from Kharkov Airport due to an incorrectly programmed altimeter caused by an ATC error, killing 19 of 50 on board.

22 November 1975 A Balkan Bulgarian Airlines An-24B (LZ-ANA) crashed on takeoff from Vrazhdebna Airport due to icing, killing three of 45 on board.

13 January 1976 An Aeroflot An-24B (CCCP-47280) crashed short of the runway at Smolnoye Airport after the crew descended too soon; all 44 on board survived, but the aircraft was written off.

21 January 1976 A CAAC An-24 (B-492) crashed on approach to Huanghua Airport, killing all 40 on board.

9 February 1976 A Tarom An-24RV (YR-AMC) crashed short of the runway at Bacau Airport due to fog, collapsing the nosegear; all 24 on board survived, but the aircraft was written off.

10 March 1976 An Aeroflot An-24RV (CCCP-46613) landed hard at Saratov Airport after the crew descended too soon; all 57 on board survived, but the aircraft was written off.

18 March 1976 A Cubana An-24B (CU-T879) collided in mid-air with a Cubana DC-8 (CU-T1200) near Havana; the An-24 crashed, killing the five crew; the DC-8 landed safely.

15 May 1976 Aeroflot Flight 1802, an An-24RV (CCCP-46534), crashed near Chernigov due to loss of control caused by an unexplained rudder deflection, killing all 52 on board.

13 August 1976 An Aeroflot An-24B (CCCP-47734) landed hard at Guryev Airport after the crew deviated from the glide path; all 43 on board survived, but the aircraft was written off.

9 September 1976 Aeroflot Flight 7957, an An-24RV (CCCP-46518), collided in mid-air with an Aeroflot Yakovlev Yak-40 operating as Flight 31 over the Black Sea off Anapa due to ATC and crew errors, killing all 64 on board both aircraft.

17 December 1976 Aeroflot Flight N-36, an An-24 (CCCP-46722), crashed short of the runway at Zhulyany Airport due to poor visibility, killing 48 of 55 on board.

19 April 1977 A Soviet Air Force An-24 crashed in poor visibility at Moe, Estonia after a wing struck a chimney of a spirit factory, killing all 21 on board. The aircraft was carrying Sukhoi Su-9 pilots from the PVO fighter regiment at Tapa.

26 May 1977 An Aeroflot An-24B (CCCP-46806) was hijacked by one person and diverted to Sweden.

18 June 1977 A Balkan Bulgarian Airlines An-24 from Vidin Airport to Sofia was hijacked shortly after takeoff by one person requesting the plane land in London subsequently Munich, it was forced to land in Belgrade (Serbia, Yugoslavia), where the hijacker was neutralized by the authorities.

8 July 1977 An Aeroflot An-24RV (CCCP-46847) crashed in the Black Sea after takeoff from Sukhumi Airport due to possible pilot distraction, killing six of seven crew.

18 October 1977 A LOT Polish Airlines An-24B (SP-LTH) was hijacked by people who demanded to be taken to Austria.

9 December 1977 Aeroflot Flight 134, an An-24RV (CCCP-47695), crashed and burned after takeoff from Tarko-Sale Airport due to a loss of control, killing 17 of 23 on board.

19 April 1978 A LOT Polish Airlines An-24B (SP-LTN) crashed near Rzeszów during a training flight.

28 August 1978 A Romanian Government An-24V (YR-AMV) burned out after landing at Kogalniceanu Airport after a fire started in the cockpit; all six crew jumped from the aircraft and survived.

23 October 1978 Aeroflot Flight 6515, an An-24B (CCCP-46327) crashed in the Gulf of Sivash off Emelyanovka, Ukraine due to loss of control caused by icing and double engine failure, killing all 26 on board.

10 November 1978 A passenger attempted to hijack an Aeroflot An-24B (CCCP-46789) to Turkey. The hijacker injured the flight engineer and fired at the armored cockpit door, but a round ricocheted off the door and hit the hijacker, killing him. The aircraft landed safely at Makhachkala, but was written off three months later in February 1979, apparently suffering some damage in the incident.

17 November 1978 A Romanian Air Force An-24V (YR-AMP) crashed at Arad Airport due to possible icing, killing the five crew.

19 December 1978 An Aeroflot An-24B (CCCP-46299) crashed near Samarkand Airport due to a loss of control while on a training flight, killing the five crew.

1978 An Aeroflot An-24B (CCCP-46350) force-landed near Budyonnovsk, Rostov Oblast, Russia after both engines failed at  due to icing; all on board survived. The accident occurred in 1977 or 1978 but before November 9, 1978.

15 January 1979 Aeroflot Flight 7502, an An-24B (CCCP-46807), crashed near Minsk-1 International Airport due to tail icing caused by pilot error, killing 13 of 14 on board.

1 May 1979 A MIAT Mongolian Airlines An-24B (BNMAU-1202) ran off the runway while landing at Erdenet Airport.

3 September 1979 Aeroflot Flight A-513, an An-24B (CCCP-46269) crashed near Amderma Airport due to crew error, killing 40 of 43 on board.

1980s

20 March 1980 A CAAC Airlines An-24RV (B-484) crashed and burned near Changsha Airport, killing all 26 on board.

31 March 1980 An Air Guinee An-24B (3X-GAU) overran the runway on landing at Conakry Airport; all 35 on board survived. The aircraft was probably written off.

14 April 1980 Aeroflot Flight 151, an An-24B (CCCP-47732) with 53 on board, crashed during an emergency landing at Krasnoyarsk Airport after the right main landing gear was damaged on takeoff; after touchdown, the landing gear broke off and the right wing was damaged, causing a fuel leak and fire. Two passengers left the aircraft on the right side and suffered burns; both passengers died later in a hospital.

18 April 1980 An Aeroflot An-24B (CCCP-46220) crashed on takeoff from Bykovo Airport due to crew error; all 47 on board survived, but the aircraft burned out and was written off. The crew had not selected flaps for takeoff.

24 September 1980 An Iraqi Airways An-24TV (YI-AEM) was probably written off while parked at Kirkuk Airport during the Iran–Iraq War. Heavy fighting had been reported in the area at the time.

4 December 1980 A LOT Polish Airlines An-24B (SP-LTB) was hijacked by one person and flown to Tegel Airport.

10 January 1981 A LOT Polish Airlines An-24B (SP-LTB) was hijacked a second time by four people who demanded to be taken to "the West"; the aircraft was stormed and hijackers arrested.

8 March 1981 An Antonov Design Bureau An-24 (CCCP-46280) struck trees and crashed at Kursk after descending below the glide scope; the aircraft burned out.

26 March 1981 LOT Polish Airlines Flight 691, an An-24B (SP-LTU) from Warsaw to Słupsk with 52 passengers and crew on board, struck a tree and crashed 2 km from Redzikowo Airport while on approach due to a misread altimeter and/or improper operation of the altimeter by the crew. One passenger was killed, 4 or 5 persons were seriously injured.

21 July 1981 A LOT Polish Airlines An-24B (SP-LTI) was hijacked by one person and diverted to West Germany.

5 August 1981 A LOT Polish Airlines An-24B (SP-LTI) was hijacked a second time by one person; the aircraft was stormed and the hijacker arrested after landing at Gdansk.

11 August 1981 A LOT Polish Airlines An-24 (SP-LTT) operating a flight from Katowice to Gdańsk was hijacked, and one hijacker demanded to be taken to West Germany. The aircraft was stormed and hijacker arrested with duration of the hijacking less than 1 day. The same registered plane was used in Polish film series "07 zgłoś się", as a hijacked plane.

22 August 1981 A LOT Polish Airlines An-24B (SP-LTC) was hijacked by one person and diverted to West Germany.

24 August 1981 Aeroflot Flight 811, an An-24RV (CCCP-46653), collided in mid-air with Soviet Air Force Tu-16K 07514 over the Zavitinsky District, Russia, killing 31 of 32 on board the An-24 and all six on board the Tu-16.

18 September 1981 A LOT Polish Airlines An-24B (SP-LTG) was hijacked by 12 people and diverted to West Germany. A Soviet Mi-8 helicopter attempted, but failed, to prevent the An-24 from landing.

22 September 1981 A LOT Polish Airlines An-24B (SP-LTK) was hijacked by four people who demanded to be taken to West Germany; the aircraft was stormed and hijackers arrested.

29 September 1981 A LOT Polish Airlines An-24B (SP-LTP) was hijacked by one person who demanded to be taken to West Germany; the aircraft was stormed and the hijacker arrested.

25 January 1982 A TAROM An-24RV (YR-BMD) crashed near Constanta Airport after the number one propeller feathered due to a feathering system malfunction during a training flight, killing all seven crew.

22 April 1982 An Iraqi Airways An-24B (YI-AEO) crashed in Iraq after the wing struck the ground while on final approach to an airfield.

30 April 1982 A LOT Polish Airlines An-24B (SP-LTG) was hijacked a second time by eight hijackers. The hijackers overpowered the six security personnel (two were injured) on board and flew to West Berlin. Upon landing the hijackers were taken into custody by American authorities who then turned them over to West Berlin authorities; the hijackers requested political asylum. Twenty-eight passengers remained in West Berlin, while the aircraft, its crew and remaining passengers returned to Poland. The hijackers were given two to four years in prison for endangering air traffic.

12 May 1982 Soviet Air Force An-24T 11 stalled and crashed near Petrovsk Air Base during a training flight, killing the five crew; the aircraft was simulating a number one engine failure when the aircraft descended below the glide scope and lost airspeed, causing the aircraft to stall and crash near the runway as the aircraft was too low to recover.

28 August 1982 An Iraqi Airways An-24RV (YI-ALN) crashed on takeoff from Nasiriyah Airport due to landing gear failure.

7 November 1982 An Aeroflot An-24 was hijacked by three passengers and diverted to Turkey; three on board were injured by the hijackers. The aircraft landed at Sinop and the injured were released. The hijackers requested political asylum after surrendering to Turkish authorities.

22 November 1982 A LOT Polish Airlines An-24B (SP-LTK) was hijacked a second time by a security guard and diverted to West Berlin. The hijacker jumped off the plane shortly after landing; the other security guards opened fire on the hijacker, hitting him in the right foot; he was then taken into custody by U.S. officials and turned over to West German authorities. Four passengers requested political asylum in West Berlin.

16 December 1982 An Aeroflot An-24B (CCCP-46567) belly-landed in a field at Sakhansky, Shyriaieve Raion, Ukraine due to smoke in the cockpit caused by an electrical fire; all on board survived, but the aircraft was written off.

7 March 1983 A Balkan Bulgarian Airlines An-24B (LZ-AND) was hijacked by four knife-wielding hijackers who demanded to be taken to Turkey, however the pilot tricked the hijackers by circling over the Black Sea and landing at the partially-lit Varna Airport. Security personnel killed one hijacker who threatened a stewardess and arrested the three remaining hijackers.

25 June 1983 A MIAT Mongolian Airlines An-24RV (BNMAU-8401) lost control and crashed on landing at Buyant Ulaa Airport following engine problems; all 47 on board survived.

24 December 1983 Aeroflot Flight 601, an An-24RV (CCCP-46617) crashed at Leshukonskoye Airport while attempting a go-around following a stall caused by pilot error, killing 44 of 49 on board.

28 January 1984 Aeroflot Flight 923, an An-24RV (CCCP-47310) crashed on approach to Izhevsk Airport due to an elevator control failure caused by improper maintenance, killing four of 53 on board.

 

18 January 1985 CAAC Flight 5109, an An-24B (B-434), stalled and crashed near Jinan Airport while attempting a missed approach, killing 38 of 41 on board.

22 February 1985 An Air Mali An-24B (TZ-ACT) crashed near Tombouctou Airport while attempting to return to the airport following an engine failure, killing 51 of 52 on board.

April 1985 A MIAT Mongolian Airlines An-24RV (BNMAU-10207) was reported to have crashed while descending to an airport in Khövsgöl Province, Mongolia; the wreckage was reportedly seen at Ulan Bator Airport in 1995.

19 December 1985 Aeroflot Flight 101/435, an An-24, was hijacked by the co-pilot who demanded that the pilot change course. The aircraft ran out of fuel and landed in a pasture near Gannan, China; the hijacker was arrested by Chinese authorities and the 43 people on board were returned to the Soviet Union; the aircraft was flown back to the Soviet Union in January 1986.

2 March 1986 An Aeroflot An-24B (CCCP-46423) stalled and crashed near Bugulma Airport after a propeller feathered due to electrical failure, killing all 38 on board.

5 September 1986 A TAROM An-24RV (YR-AMF) crashed on landing at Cluj Airport after landing with the nose gear up, killing three of five crew; all 50 passengers survived.

15 December 1986 A CAAC An-24RV (B-3413) crashed at Zhongchuan Airport while attempting to return to the airport after an engine failed in icing conditions, killing six of 44 on board.

23 January 1987 A MIAT Mongolian Airlines An-24RV (BNMAU-7710) crashed on landing at Buyant Ulaa Airport.

11 March 1987 Three passengers attempted to hijack Cubana Flight 706 (an An-24RV, CU-T1262) shortly before takeoff from Havana. The hijackers, armed with hand grenades, demanded to be taken to the United States. Passengers struggled with the hijackers, during which one of the grenades exploded, injuring 13 people. One hijacker was killed by a policeman on board while the other two hijackers were arrested.

8 July 1988 An Aeroflot An-24RV (CCCP-46669) collided with buildings after overrunning the runway on takeoff from Khabarovsk Novy Airport.

2 November 1988 LOT Polish Airlines Flight 703 force-landed in a field near Rzeszów after both engines failed due to icing, killing one passenger. The other 24 passengers and four crew on board the aircraft survived, though most of them received serious injuries. In the wake of this accident, LOT removed all An-24 aircraft from service and replaced them with the ATR 42 and ATR 72.

21 January 1989 An Aeroflot An-24 was taxiing at Ivano-Frankovsk Airport when a passenger, armed with a lit torch, attempted to hijack the aircraft and demanded that the crew fly abroad. The hijacker's torch started a fire that burned the pilot and two passengers, but the crew was able to subdue the hijacker.

31 January 1989 A Democratic Republic of Afghanistan Air Force An-24, possibly on a bombing run, was shot down by a Pakistani F-16B near Bannu, Pakistan.

15 August 1989 China Eastern Airlines Flight 5510, an An-24RV (B-3417), crashed on takeoff from Hongqiao Airport due to engine failure, killing 34 of 40 on board.

24 August 1989 An An-24 was written off in a criminal act at Kabul, Afghanistan.

4 October 1989 An Aeroflot An-24RV (CCCP-46525) came in too high and too fast while approaching Stepnogorsk Airport and landed late as a result. The aircraft skidded off the runway and struck a concrete pillar, but the aircraft had suffered severe damage as it also had run across some holes in the ground. The pilot decided to taxi back to the apron, but while taxiing back the aircraft suffered more damage, causing the propeller blades to break off. All 52 on board survived.

21 November 1989 Aeroflot Flight 37577, an An-24B (CCCP-46335), struck trees and crashed near Sovetsky Airport, Russia, killing 34 of 42 on board.

28 December 1989 During the Romanian Revolution, a TAROM An-24RV (YR-BMJ) flying from Bucharest to Belgrade, carrying photojournalist Ian Parry, crashed in bad weather near Vişina, Dâmboviţa, Romania while on a flight to pick up humanitarian supplies, killing all seven (six crew members and the passenger) on board. The aircraft was probably shot down by a missile.

1990s

9 January 1990 A Sudanese Air Force aircraft, possibly an An-24, was shot down and crashed at Kajo Kaji, South Sudan.

26 January 1990 A MIAT Mongolian Airlines An-24RV (BNMAU-10208) crashed near Ulaangom Airport at night,  all 41 passengers and crew on board have survived.

22 April 1990 A Lao Aviation An-24RV (RDPL-34008) failed to take off from Luang Namtha Airport and overran the runway; the aircraft struck a building, killing one person on the ground; the three crew on board the aircraft survived.

2 June 1990 An Aeroflot An-24B (CCCP-46551) crashed at Kenkiyak, Kazakhstan after landing hard and overrunning the runway; all 33 passengers and crew on board survived, but the aircraft was written off.

7 October 1990 A person attempted to hijack an Aeroflot An-24 to Sweden; the hijacker threatened to detonate a bomb if the aircraft was not diverted to Stockholm. The hijacker was overpowered by the crew and passengers and was arrested when the aircraft landed in Kotlas.

14 December 1990 An Aeroflot An-24B (CCCP-47164) crashed at Shakhtersk Airport after landing hard and overrunning the runway; all 43 passengers and crew on board survived, but the aircraft was written off.

29 January 1991 An Iraqi Airways An-24V (YI-AEZ) was damaged by bombing at Balad Air Base.

4 March 1991 An Aeroflot An-24 was hijacked by a man who demanded to be flown to Sweden. The hijacker reportedly had an anti-tank grenade and threatened to blow up the aircraft if his demands were not met. The aircraft landed in Leningrad where the hijacker released the 26 passengers but refused to surrender. The grenade exploded, damaging the aircraft and injuring the hijacker, who later died.

23 March 1991 An Aeroflot An-24RV (CCCP-46472) overran the runway at Navoi Airport and struck iron-concrete slabs, killing 34 of 63 on board.

26 September 1991 An AKF Polet An-24 (CCCP-46724) crashed in the Gulf of Finland off Saint Petersburg shortly after takeoff, killing all 10 on board.

26 November 1991 A Tatarstan Airlines An-24RV (CCCP-47823) crashed near Bugulma Airport due to tail icing, killing all 41 (some sources say 42) on board.

22 February 1992 A Trans Amazon An-24RV (OB-1439) overran the runway on landing at Rodriguez Ballon Airport after landing too far down the runway; all 45 on board survived, but the aircraft was written off.

7 April 1992 An Air Bissau An-24RV (J5-GAE) force-landed near Sarra, Libya after flying into a severe sandstorm, killing three of 13 on board; Yasser Arafat was among the survivors.

28 July 1992 A Balkan Bulgarian Airlines An-24B (LZ-ANN) was written off while parked at Sofia Airport due to damage from a falling crane.

2 September 1992 An Aeroflot An-24B (CCCP-46816) landed on its belly near Guryev Airport due to a loss of speed and icing while attempting a missed approach following engine failure; all 49 on board survived, but the aircraft was written off.

21 November 1992 A Yugavia An-24B (RA-46306) bounced on landing at Krasnodar Airport, damaging the nose gear and airframe; all 20 on board survived, but the aircraft was written off.

16 January 1993 A Kazakhstan Airlines An-24RV (46478) crashed short of the runway at Kostanay, Kazakhstan due to engine failure; after hitting the ground, the aircraft slid onto the ramp and struck a parked military An-24; all 23 on board survived.

3 February 1993 A Yakutavia An-24B (47180) ran off the runway on takeoff from Ust-Kuiga due to loss of control; all 27 on board survived, but the aircraft was written off.

6 April 1993 A Latavio Latvian Airlines An-24RV (YL-LCH) overran the runway on landing at Stepanavan Airport following nosegear collapse after landing nosewheel-first; all 32 on board survived, but the aircraft was written off.

1 February 1994 A Kolyma-Avia An-24B (RA-47718) veered off the runway into a mound of packed snow while taking off from Omsukchan Airport; all 53 on board survived, but the aircraft was written off.

8 May 1994 A Cubana An-24 was hijacked by the pilot; after forcing the co-pilot out of the cockpit, the pilot locked himself inside and diverted the aircraft to Miami, Florida where he requested political asylum. The remaining six crew flew back to Cuba with the aircraft; the 16 passengers- none of which were Cuban citizens- were released to continue their vacations.

17 July 1994 Bykovo Avia Flight 86, an An-24B (RA-46575), sank back on the runway during takeoff from Kherson Airport after the flight engineer raised the landing gear too soon; the aircraft slid down the runway on its belly and stopped  from the beginning of the runway. All 32 on board survived.

13 August 1994 An Uzbekistan Air Force An-24 was involved in an accident in Uzbekistan.

6 February 1995 An Arkhangelsk Airlines An-24B (RA-46564) ran off the side of the runway while landing at Talaghy Airport and struck a snowbank; all 38 on board survived, but the aircraft was written off.

21 September 1995 MIAT Flight 557, an An-24RV (BNMAU-10103), struck a mountain near Choho Geologoh Uul in bad weather after the crew descended too soon; of the 43 on board, only a passenger survived.

1 November 1995 A Kazakhstan Airlines An-24B (UN-47710) landed hard short of the runway at Shymkent during a training flight; while on approach the left engine was shut down and airspeed decreased. Instead of increasing power to the right engine, it too was shut down. A hard landing was performed  short of the runway.

13 December 1995 Banat Air Flight 166, an An-24B (YR-AMR), crashed on takeoff from Verona Airport due to wing icing and overloading, killing all 49 passengers and crew on board. The aircraft was chartered from Romavia.

21 December 1995 A Kuban Airlines An-24RV (RA-46473) was written off after the nosegear collapsed on landing at Krasnodar Airport.

29 December 1995 A Saransk Flight Unit An-24B (RA-46401) crashed on approach to Saransk when the left wing touched the ground while in a steep turn; all five on board survived, but the aircraft was written off.

22 February 1996 A Romanian CAA An-24RV (YR-BMK) crashed near Baia Mare Airport after the pilot executed a turn incorrectly, killing all eight on board as well as two on the ground.

25 February 1996 A Kampuchea Airlines An-24RV (XU-314) overran the runway on landing at Ratanakiri Airport due to brake failure; several tires blew and the aircraft crashed into a building. All 42 on board survived.

3 May 1996 A Federal Airlines An-24RV (ST-FAG) crashed near Haj Yousif, Sudan while attempting a forced landing following several failed approaches, killing all 53 passengers and crew on board.

6 November 1996 Sakha Avia Flight 17, an An-24RV (RA-47356), landed on a runway that was under construction at Ust-Nera Airport. ATC warned the crew during final approach, but it was too late. The pilot attempted a go-around during landing, but the co-pilot aborted the attempt seconds later. The flight engineer then raised the landing gear and the aircraft came to rest on its belly, suffering severe damage.

18 March 1997 Stavropolskaya Aktsionernaya Avia Flight 1023, an An-24RV (RA-46516), crashed into a forest at Cherkessk, Russia due to structural failure, killing all 50 on board.

20 March 1997 A Sudanese Air Force An-24TV crashed near Juba Airport due to engine failure, killing the four crew; the aircraft was possibly shot down.

11 July 1997 Cubana Flight 787, an An-24RV (CU-T1262), crashed off Santiago, Cuba due to a loss of control, killing all 44 passengers and crew on board.

29 September 1998 Lionair Flight 602, an An-24RV (EW-46465), fell into the sea off the north-western coast of Sri Lanka under mysterious circumstances. The aircraft departed Jaffna-Palaly Air Force Base on a flight to Colombo and disappeared from radar screens just after the pilot had reported depressurization. Initial reports indicated that the plane had been shot down by Liberation Tigers of Tamil Eelam rebels. All 7 crew and 48 passengers were killed. The aircraft had been leased from Gomelavia.

2000s

15 November 2000 An ASA Pesada An-24RV (D2-FCG) crashed shortly after takeoff from Quatro de Fevereiro Airport, Luanda, Angola, due to loss of control, killing all 57 on board.

1 December 2000 An An-24 was hijacked by two people who demanded to be flown to western Congo. One hijacker was killed by a DR Congo rebel after he attempted to enter the cockpit. The second hijacker fired several rounds before being subdued, but none of the other 15 on board were injured. The surviving hijacker was held for questioning; lax security at Goma Airport was blamed for the incident.

4 April 2001 A Sudanese Air Force An-24 crashed on take-off in Adaril near Malakal.

October 2001 Three Ariana Afghan Airlines An-24s (YA-DAH, YA-DAJ and YA-DAG) were destroyed on the ground at Kabul, Afghanistan during a U.S. bombing raid.

13 July 2002 A Sakha Avia An-24RV (RA-46670) landed wheels-up at Yakutsk Airport during a training flight due to crew error; all four crew survived, but the aircraft was written off.

31 March 2003 A Cubana An-24 (CU-T1294) was hijacked by a man who was believed to have had two grenades. The aircraft then flew to Havana for refueling; after 26 passengers were released, the aircraft flew to Key West, Florida.

25 April 2003 A Sudanese Air Force An-24 (tail number 700) was destroyed on the ground at El Fasher Airport during a Sudan Liberation Army rebel attack.

14 June 2003 A Cubana An-24RV (CU-T1295) ran off the runway at Rafael Cabrera Airport due to hydraulic system failure; all 52 passengers and crew on board survived, but the aircraft was written off.

16 September 2004 A Kam Air An-24RV (EW-74808) overran the runway at Khwaja Rawash Airport after returning to the airport following engine failure.

4 March 2005 A Trans Air Congo An-24B (EY-46399) ran off the runway at Impfondo Airport.

16 March 2005 Regional Airlines Flight 9288, an An-24RV (RA-46438), stalled and crashed into a small hill near Varandey, Russia due to possible instrument failure, killing 28 of 52 on board. The aircraft was on lease from Kuzbass Aero Freight.

2 June 2005 Marsland Aviation Flight 430, an An-24B (ST-WAL), crashed on takeoff from Khartoum Civil Airport, killing seven of 42 on board. The aircraft was on lease from al-Majal Company.

16 July 2005 An Equatorial Express Airlines An-24B crashed into a jungle near Baney shortly after takeoff, killing all 60 people on board. The aircraft was overloaded; it was designed for a maximum of 48 people, not 60. The crash remains the worst air disaster in Equatorial Guinea and the worst air disaster involving the An-24.

2 November 2005 An SAT Airlines An-24 (RA-46618) landed hard at Yuzhno-Sakhalinsk Airport, collapsing the nose gear.

23 December 2005 An Aero-Service An-24RV (ER-AZX) ran off the runway at Pokola, Congo. The aircraft was on lease from Pecotox Air.

19 January 2006 Slovak Air Force An-24B 5605 with 43 persons on board (of which 28 were soldiers) crashed in Hungary, only 3 km from the Slovak border. Only one person survived, and 42 were reported dead. The plane was carrying Slovak KFOR forces that had been serving in Kosovo for half a year. The accident remains the worst in Hungary.

23 March 2006 A Valan International Cargo Charter An-24B (ER-AZZ) force-landed at Talil, Iraq due to engine failure.

25 June 2007 PMTair Flight 241 crashed in mountains 130 km south of the capital Phnom Penh. The flight was en route from Siem Reap, near the historic Angkor Wat temples, to the coastal town of Sihanoukville. All 22 on board were killed.

18 July 2007 A Malift Air aircraft, probably an An-24, crashed shortly after takeoff from Bandundu Airport due to engine failure.

July 2007 An Aquiline An-24B (EX-030) crashed in Ethiopia due to engine failure.

18 September 2008 A EuroLine An-24RV (4L-MJX) landed hard at Tbilisi Airport, breaking the nose gear.

13 January 2009 A Daallo Airlines An-24RV (S9-KAS) landed nosegear-up at Bender Qassim International Airport after the nosegear failed to come down while on approach. All 15 on board survived, but the aircraft was written off.

18 May 2009 A Phoenix Avia aircraft, probably An-24T (EK-46839), ran off the runway on takeoff from Aba Tenna D Yilma Airport in heavy fog; all four crew survived, but the aircraft was written off.

August 2009 An Uzbekistan Airways An-24RV (UK-46658) was reportedly written off after the landing gear was raised too soon during takeoff from Zarafshan Airport.

2 November 2009 Daallo Airlines Flight 774, an An-24RV (EY-46793) was hijacked en route between Bossaso and Djibouti; two passengers wielded guns and demanded to be flown to Las Qorey. The hijackers were overpowered by passengers; the aircraft returned to Bossaso where the hijackers were arrested.

2010s

4 February 2010 Yakutia Airlines Flight 425, operated by RA-47360 suffered an engine failure on take-off from Yakutsk Airport for Olekminsk Airport. During the subsequent landing, the nose and port main undercarriage were retracted, causing substantial damage to the aircraft.

17 May 2010 Pamir Airways Flight 112 crashed 100 km away from Kabul International Airport. The plane was en route from Kunduz Airport to Kabul, when it suddenly disappeared from radar. The aircraft was found two days later in the Salang Pass; all 44 on board were killed.

3 August 2010 Katekavia Flight 9357 crashed on approach to Igarka Airport, Russia. Twelve people were killed. The aircraft was on a domestic scheduled passenger flight from Krasnoyarsk Airport.

11 November 2010 A Tarco Airlines An-24 from Khartoum International Airport crashed on landing at Zalingei Airport, Sudan. Six people were killed. One person received serious injuries and another five escaped with minor injuries The remaining 32 passengers and five crew escaped injury.

14 December 2010 Nordavia Flight 137, an An-24RV (RA-47305), overran the runway on landing at Rogachevo Air Base, collapsing the right main landing gear; all 39 on board survived, but the aircraft was written off.

2011 A Katekavia An-24RV landed hard at Chita Airport during 2011; the accident occurred between 30 March when the aircraft was seen active at Bodaybo and 29 December when it was removed from the Russian register.

11 July 2011 Angara Airlines Flight 9007, an Antonov An-24 (registration RA-47302) operating from Tomsk to Surgut, Russia, suffered an in-flight engine fire, prompting the crew to ditch the aircraft in the Ob River. Of the 37 people on board, 7 passengers were killed. The aircraft was written off.

8 August 2011 IrAero Flight 103 overran the runway on landing at Blagoveshchensk Airport, Russia. Twelve of the 36 people on board were injured.

28 April 2012 Jubba Airways flight 6J-711 blew both right main gear tires on landing, causing the aircraft to veer off the runway at Abdullahi Yusuf International Airport in Galkayo, Somalia. The wing separated from the body of the aircraft.  No injuries were reported, although the aircraft was substantially damaged.

13 February 2013 South Airlines Flight 8971 stalled and crashed on landing at Donetsk International Airport while on an internal Ukrainian flight between Odessa and Donetsk following a loss of airspeed caused by pilot error, killing five of 52 on board.

9 August 2013 An Ethiopian Air Force An-24 crashed at Mogadishu International Airport while carrying ammunition, killing four of the six crew.

22 January 2014 A Pskovavia An-24RV (RA-46473) suffered serious damage while landing at Domodedovo Airport when the aircraft touched down between the runway and the airport boundary.

27 June 2019 Angara Airlines Flight 200 overran the runway on landing at Nizhneangarsk Airport, Russia. Two of the 47 people on board were killed.

2020s 
19 August 2022 An airport employee at the Beloyarsk Airport died after falling under the propeller of an An-24 aircraft of UTair Airlines.

References

Antonov An-24

Accidents and incidents involving airliners